Ancient Greek verbs have four moods (indicative, imperative, subjunctive and optative), three voices (active, middle and passive), as well as three persons (first, second and third) and three numbers (singular, dual and plural).

 In the indicative mood there are seven tenses: present, imperfect, future, aorist (the equivalent of past simple),  perfect, pluperfect, and future perfect. (The last two, especially the future perfect, are rarely used). 
 In the subjunctive and imperative mood, however, there are only three tenses (present, aorist, and perfect).
 The optative mood, infinitives and participles are found in four tenses (present, aorist, perfect, and future) and all three voices. 

The distinction of the "tenses" in moods other than the indicative is predominantly one of aspect rather than time.

The different persons of a Greek verb are shown by changing the verb-endings; for example  "I free",  "you free",  "he or she frees", etc. There are three persons in the singular ("I", "you (singular)", "he, she, it"), and three in the plural ("we", "you (plural)", "they"). In addition there are endings for the 2nd and 3rd persons dual ("you two", "they both"), but these are only very rarely used.

A distinction is traditionally made between the so-called athematic verbs (also called mi-verbs), with endings affixed directly to the root, and the thematic class of verbs which present a "thematic" vowel  or  before the ending. The endings are classified into primary (those used in the present, future, perfect and future perfect of the indicative, as well as in the subjunctive) and secondary (used in the aorist, imperfect, and pluperfect of the indicative, as well as in the optative).

To make the past tenses of the indicative mood, the vowel , called an "augment", is prefixed to the verb stem, e.g. aorist  "I freed", imperfect  "I was freeing". This augment is found only in the indicative, not in the other moods or in the infinitive or participle. To make the perfect tense the first consonant is "reduplicated", that is, repeated with the vowel e ( "I have freed",  "I have written"), or in some cases an augment is used in lieu of reduplication (e.g.  "I have found"). Unlike the augment of past tenses, this reduplication or augment is retained in all the moods of the perfect tense as well as in the perfect infinitive and participle.

The Ancient Greek verbal system preserves nearly all the complexities of Proto-Indo-European (PIE). Ancient Greek also preserves the PIE middle voice and adds a passive voice, with separate forms only in the future and aorist (elsewhere, the middle forms are used).

Voices 
The Ancient Greek verb has three voices: active, middle, and passive. The middle and the passive voice are identical in the present, imperfect, perfect, and pluperfect tenses, but differ in the future and aorist tenses.

Active voice 
Active voice verbs are those which end in  -ō or  -mi in the 1st person singular of the present tense. An active voice verb can be intransitive, transitive or reflexive (but intransitive is most common):
 
 
 He sailed to Athens.

 .
 
 They were guarding the walls.

 .
 .
 He killed himself.

Middle voice 
These can be either passive or non-passive in meaning. When the meaning of such a verb is not passive, it is known as a "middle voice" verb.

Middle voice verbs are usually intransitive, but can also be transitive. Often the middle endings make a transitive verb intransitive:
  (paúomai) "I stop (intransitive)"
  (hístamai) "I stand (intransitive)"

Sometimes there is a reflexive meaning or an idea of doing something for one's own benefit:
  "I have a bath"
  "I take for myself, I choose"
  "I send for someone"

Sometimes there can be a reciprocal meaning:
  "to make a treaty"

Quite a number of verbs which are active in the present tense become middle in the future tense, e.g.:
  "I will take"
  "I will hear"
  "I will be"

Deponent middle verbs 
These are known as "deponent" verbs.

Deponent middle verbs include verbs such as the following. Some have a "weak" aorist:
  "I receive" – aorist: 
  "I fight" – aorist: 
  "I answer" – aorist: 

With "strong" aorist:
  "I become" – aorist: 
  "I arrive" – aorist: 
  "I find out" – aorist: 
  "I promise" – aorist: 

Irregular:
  "I come" – aorist: 

Aorist middle
, but frequently they have a strong aorist middle such as  "I arrived" or  "I became". ( "I come" is irregular in that it uses a strong aorist active  "I came" as its aorist tense.)

Passive deponent verbs
All the above, since they have an aorist in the middle voice, are known as middle deponents.
  "I am able" – aorist: 
  "I am minded to, I want" – aorist: 
  "I think" – aorist: 

Sentences with deponent verbs

 .
 .
 He received the gifts.

 .
 .
 When the Athenians came near, the two sides began fighting.

 
 
 He became unable to say any more.

Passive voice 
If so, it is said to be in the passive voice:
 .
 .
 The city was being ruled by the Spartans.

 .
 .
 It is written in the law. ( it has been written)

Usually when used passively,  (-omai) verbs have an aorist tense containing  (-thē-) in the ending:
 .
 .
 Those men were deservedly honoured.

Occasionally, an aorist passive can have an ending with -η- (-ē-). This is known as the 2nd aorist or strong aorist passive, and uses a different verb-stem from the present. In the example below, the stem is  instead of the present stem :
 .
 .
 The majority were killed.

Deponent middle verbs can also be made passive in some tenses. Thus αἱρέομαι (hairéomai) "I choose" has an aorist passive ᾑρέθην (hēiréthēn) "I was chosen":
 .
 .
 He was chosen by them as general.

The endings with -θη- (-thē-) and -η- (-ē-) were originally intransitive actives rather than passives and sometimes have an intransitive meaning even in Classical Greek. For example, ἐσώθην (esṓthē) (from  sōízō "I save") often means "I got back safely" rather than "I was saved":
 .
 .
 The ship did not get back safely to Piraeus.

Thematic and athematic verbs 
"we free"), and the athematic (in which the endings are attached directly to the stem, e.g. "we are". Thematic verbs are much more numerous.

Thematic verbs

Active verbs 
These are very numerous, for example,  "I say",  "I write",  "I send", etc. The endings of these tend to be regular:
 
 
 I say, you say, he/she/it says, (you two say, they both say,) we say, you say, they say

The forms in brackets are the dual number, used for two people, and which exists only in the 2nd and 3rd person; it is rather rare, but still used sometimes by authors such as Aristophanes and Plato:
 .
 .
 Homer and Hesiod both say the same things.

"to say".

Middle verbs 
Thematic verbs are also found in the middle voice, with the 1st person singular ending  e.g.  "I answer",  "I become". The endings of the present tense go as follows:
 
 
 I, you (singular), he/she/it, (you two, the two of them), we, you (plural), they

"to answer".

Some middle verbs are attested in the first person dual, albeit rarely:
 
 
 And so we two are going

Many middle-voice verbs, such as  "I answer", are deponent, that is to say, they have no corresponding active form. Other middle verbs, such as  "I cease (doing something)" (intransitive), have a corresponding active form:  "I stop (something)" (transitive).

Passive verbs
Passive verbs, in the present, imperfect, and perfect tenses, have exactly the same endings as middle verbs. Examples are  "I am pursued" and  "I am ordered (by someone)".

Contracted verbs 

A special class of thematic verbs are the contracted verbs. Thus the present tense of  "I see" goes as follows:
 
 
 I see, you see, he/she/it sees, (you both see, they both see,) we see, you see, they see

While the present tense of  "I do" is as follows:
 
 
 I do, you do, he/she/it does, (you both do, they both do,) we do, you (plural) do, they do

And the present tense of  "I show" is as follows:
 
 
 I show, you show, he/she/it shows, (you both show, they both show,) we show, you (plural) show, they show

Contracted verbs are also found in the middle and passive voices, e.g.  "I arrive" and  "I am honoured".

Athematic verbs

Active 
Athematic verbs have  in the 1st person singular of the present tense, e.g.  "I am",  "I say",  "I give",  "I stand (transitive)". In the middle voice they end in  e.g.  "I am able". The present tense of  "I (will) go" is generally used with future meaning in the classical period.

These verbs present many irregularities in conjugation. For example, the present tense of  "I am" goes as follows:
 
 
 I am, you are, he/she/it is, (you both are, they both are), we are, you (plural) are, they are.

The present tense of the verb  "I (will) go" is as follows:
 
 
 I will go, you will go, he/she/it will go, (you both will go, they both will go), we will go, you (plural) will go, they will go.

Whereas the present tense of  "I give" goes as follows:
 
 
 I give, you give, he/she/it gives, we give, you (plural) give, they give

The dual of this verb, theoretically , is not found.

"to be",  "to go",  "to give".

Middle 
Athematic verbs are also found in the middle voice, e.g.  "I stand" or  "I am able", with endings as follows:
 
 
 I, you (singular), he/she/it, (you two, the two of them), we, you (plural), they

The verb  
The verb  "I know", is irregular. Its endings are those of an athematic perfect tense, and go as follows:
 
 
 I know, you know, he/she/it knows, (you both know, they both know), we know, you (plural) know, they know

Tenses

The tense system 
The Ancient Greek verbal system has seven tense-aspect forms, traditionally called "tenses" (singular). The temporal distinctions only appear in the indicative mood as shown on the table below:

In the subjunctive and imperative moods, however, only three tenses are used, and they distinguish aspect only, not time:

The optative mood likewise uses these three tenses, but there is also a future optative, used mainly to report indirectly what would be a future indicative in direct speech.

Ancient Greek has no perfect progressive or past perfect progressive. Thus, the meaning "he has been doing" is typically expressed with the present tense, and "he had been doing (earlier)" is expressed with the imperfect tense:

 
 
 I have been ( I am) in the business for many years now.

 
 
 The boat arrived in which we had (earlier) been drinking.

Formation of the tenses 
For further information on the endings, see Ancient Greek grammar tables.

Principal parts of verbs 
Dictionaries of Ancient Greek usually give six principal parts for any verb. For example, for the verb  "I teach, train" the six parts are as follows:
 
 
 I teach, I will teach, I taught, I have taught, I have been taught, I was taught
The best guide to the true stem of the verb is often in the future or aorist active tense (after removing any added σ sigma markers), because the present system often has progressive markers that distort the stem of the verb.

The principal parts are these:
 The present tense:  "I teach"
 Endings: 
 The future tense:  "I will teach"
 Endings: 
 The aorist active tense:  "I taught"
 Endings: 
 The perfect active tense:   "I have taught"
 Endings: 
 The perfect tense middle or passive:  "I have been taught"
 Endings: 
 The aorist passive tense:  "I was taught"
 Endings:

Other tenses 
Other tenses can be formed on the basis of these. For example, the imperfect tense  "I was teaching" is based on the present stem with the addition of the prefix  (called an "augment", see below), and the pluperfect   "I had taught" is formed from the perfect stem:
 The imperfect tense:  "I was teaching", "I used to teach"
 Endings: 
 The  pluperfect tense:  "I had taught"
 Endings:

Future and aorist without sigma
Some, particularly those whose stem ends in   such as  "I announce" and  "I remain", have a contracted future, with endings like the verb . These same verbs also usually have an aorist without sigma:
 Contracted future:  "I will announce"
 Endings: 
 Aorist without sigma:  "I announced"
 Endings:

Strong aorist
However, it differs from the imperfect in that the stem of the verb is different. Thus the aorist of  "I flee" is  "I fled", with stem , contrasting with the imperfect , with stem . The present system (imperfect and present tenses) of this verb  has an added ε epsilon as a progressive marker. The aorist and other tenses reflect the true stem .

Other strong aorists are  "I came",  "I took",  "I said",  "I ate"; and in the middle voice  "I became" and  "I arrived".

Root aorist
Many verbs have an aorist without the sigma markers and characteristic endings of the regular aorist. Typically these verbs have present progressive markers added to the stem in the present system, so that the basic stem is used in the aorist and in the other aspects. One example is the verb , "I go", which becomes .

Less regular principal parts 
For example, the verb  "I take" has the following parts:
 
 
 I take, I will take, I took, I have taken, I have been taken, I was taken

As can be seen, the stems used etc. vary from tense to tense.

The verb "I lead" goes:

 
 
 I lead, I will lead, I led, I have led, I have been led, I was led

The tenses of  "I give" are as follows:
 
 
 I give, I will give, I gave, I have given, I have been given (to someone), I was given (to someone)

However, this   is found only in the singular, and disappears in the plural, e.g. 3rd   "they gave". The verbs  "I put" and  "I send" are similar, with aorists  3rd   and  3rd   respectively.

However,  "I stand (something)" does not follow this pattern and has a different aorist:
  (trans.)/ (intrans.),  (intrans.), 
 
 I stand (something), I will stand (something), I stood (something)/I stood, I have stood/am standing, I stand, I stood/was stood

Verbs using more than one stem 
In some verbs the principal parts are even more irregular than this; like the English verbs "am/is, was, been" and "go, went, gone", they use different stems (derived from originally different verbs) for the different tenses. For example, the verb   "I bring, I bear" has the following principal parts using stems derived from three originally different verbs:
 
 
 I bring, I will bring, I brought, I have brought, I have been brought, I was brought

 
 
 I see, I will see, I saw, I have seen, I have been seen, I was seen

 "I come" or "I go" is also irregular. This verb has only four principal parts, since there is no passive:
 
 
 I come/go, I will come/go, I came/went, I have come/gone

The past-tense augment 
The three past tenses (imperfect, aorist, and pluperfect), in the classical period, are made by adding a prefix  (e-), called an "augment", on the beginning of the verb. Thus from   "I write" are made:
   "I was writing"
   "I wrote"
   "I had written"

This past-tense augment is found only in the indicative mood, not in the subjunctive, infinitive, participle, or other parts of the verb.

When a verb starts with a vowel, the augment usually merges with the vowel to make a long vowel. Thus  +  > /ē/,  +  > /ē/ (sometimes ),  +  > /ī/,  +  > /ō/ and so on:
   "I was leading", from  "I lead"
   "I had, I was holding", from  "I have, I hold"
   "I was living in", from  "I live in"

When a verb starts with a prepositional prefix, the augment usually goes after the prefix (although there are some verbs where it goes before the prefix, or even in both places):
   "I went down", from  "I go down"
   or  "I opened", from  "I open"

In Homer, and occasionally in Herodotus, the augment is sometimes omitted.

Perfect tenses 
The perfect tense is formed by repeating the first consonant of the stem with the vowel . This is known as "reduplication":
   "I have written", from  "I write"
   "I have lived", from  "I pass my life"
   "I have given", from  "I give"

When the first consonant of the verb is aspirated, the reduplication is made with the equivalent unaspirated consonant:
  "I have died", from  "I die"
  "I have fled", from  "I flee"
  "I am very happy", from  "I am happy"

   "I have found", from  "I find"
   "I have captured", from  "I capture"
  "I have learned", from  "I learn" (with the root)

More complex kinds of reduplication are found in:
   "I have heard", from  "I hear"
   "I have come", from  "I came"

Unlike the past-tense augment, this reduplication or perfect-tense augment is found in every part of the perfect tense, including the infinitive and participles.

Meanings of the tenses 
The meanings of the tenses are as follows:

The present tense 
The present tense (Greek  "standing within") can be imperfective or perfective, and be translated "I do (now)", "I do (regularly)", "I am doing (now)":

 .
 .
 I swear by all the gods!

 
 
 I see the man!

 
 
 You are always saying the same things, Socrates!

 
 
 "O Socrates", he said, "have you woken up, or are you sleeping?"

The present tense is frequently used in historical narrative, especially to describe exciting moments:
 
 
 He hurls himself at him and wounds him.

Imperfect tense 
The imperfect tense (Greek  "for prolonging", from  "prolong") is used in the indicative mood only. It often indicates a continuing situation in the past, rather than an event. It can be translated as "was doing", "used to do", "would do", etc., referring to either a progressive, habitual, or continual situation:
 
 
 The captain knew where the letter was lying.

 
 
 Every night the (two armies) would camp a parasang or more apart from each other.

 
 
 These things carried on like this for long time.

Often "began doing" is a possible translation:
 
 
 Throwing together their shields, they began shoving, fighting, killing, and dying.

 
 
 After dinner the baby began crying.

 
 
 And when dawn came, they began crossing the bridge.

As noted above, the imperfect can also mean "had been doing", referring to a situation which existed earlier than the time of the main verb:
 
 
 They sent off the ships which they had been preparing.

 
 
 I brought in a doctor that I had been using for many years.

However, although the imperfect usually describes a situation, it is often used in narrative where English would use a simple past, especially with verbs meaning "send", "go", "say", and "order":
 
 
 They sent off a messenger to Athens.

 
 
 Mindaros, seeing the battle from afar, set off to help.

 
 
 I invited him to join me for dinner ... we sat down to dinner ... he went away ... I went to sleep.

The distinction between imperfect and aorist in the above examples can be seen not so much in terms of perfectivity vs. imperfectivity, as in terms of telicity vs. atelicity. The aorist  would mean "we finished dinner" and would be a telic verb, implying that the action was carried through to its end, whereas the imperfect  would mean "we began eating dinner" and would be atelic, implying that the action was started but not necessarily completed. Similarly the aorist  means "I successfully persuaded", whereas the imperfect  means "I urged" or "I attempted to persuade":

 
 
 They urged them to turn back, but they wouldn't listen.

Another meaning of the imperfect indicative is to refer to unreal (counterfactual) situations in present or past time. To give the meaning "would", the particle  is added:

 
 
 They wouldn't be able to do this if they weren't following a temperate diet.

Future tense 
The future tense (Greek  "going to be") describes an event or a state of affairs that will happen in the future. For example, it can be something promised or predicted:

  
 
 I will lead you to the Troad.

  
 
 I will come to see you tomorrow, if God is willing.

It can also be used after  for strong commands and prohibitions:
  
 
 Make sure that no one finds out about these things.

Aorist tense 

The aorist tense (Greek  "unbounded" or "indefinite") describes a finished action in the past.
 
 
 I went down yesterday to Piraeus.

Often in narrative it is found mixed with present and imperfect tenses:
 
 
 She came back (imperfect) and opened (aorist) the door.

 
 
 She kept watch (imperfect) until she found out (aorist) what the cause was.

Often an aorist is equivalent to an English pluperfect tense, for example after  "when" or in relative clauses in sentences such as the following:
 
 
 When they had dined, he led the army out.

 
 
 He ordered me to give him the letter which I had written.

Another meaning of the aorist indicative is to refer to unreal (counterfactual) events in past time. To give the meaning "would", the particle  is added:
 
 
 He would not have done this, if I had not ordered him.

Perfect tense 
The perfect tense (Greek  "lying nearby"), much as the English perfect tense, often describes a recent event of which the present result is important:
 
 
 You have heard and you have seen (the evidence); now make your decision.

It can also, like the English perfect, be used experientially, of something that has often or always happened in the past:
 
 
 You have often heard me speaking.

In some verbs the perfect tense can be translated by a present tense in English, e.g.  "I remember",  "I am standing"/"I stand",  "I possess",  "I know":
 
 
 The inscribed stone beside which you are standing orders that you owe 1000 drachmas.

Pluperfect tense 
The pluperfect tense (Greek  "more than completed"), like the Imperfect, is used only in the indicative mood. It refers to a situation that existed due to events that had taken place at an earlier time:
 
 
 They were very annoyed that the Greeks had fled – something which they had never done before.

However, the pluperfect is much less frequently used in Greek than in English, since after conjunctions such as  "when", usually the aorist is used:
 
 
 And when they had had dinner (aorist), he began leading out the army.

Future perfect tense 
The future perfect tense (Greek  "going to be completed") is rarely used. In the active voice only two verbs (  "I will be dead" and  "I will be standing") have a separate form for the future perfect tense, though a compound ("periphrastic") tense can be made with a perfect participle, e.g  "he is going to have realised"; but even this is extremely rare. It is more common in the passive. It describes a future state that will result from a finished action:
 
 
 No friend will have been left for us.

Moods 
There are four moods (  "bendings" or "leanings"):

Indicative 
(Greek   "for defining", from   "I define").

The indicative is the form of the verb used for ordinary statements of fact:
 .
 .
 He killed the man.

To make the negative of the indicative,  or, before a vowel,  is added before the verb:
 .
 .
 He was not able to sleep.

The imperfect and aorist indicative can also sometimes refer to unreal (counterfactual) situations in present or past time ("would be doing", "should be doing", "would have done" etc.). (For further examples see above.)
 .
 .
 Why are you keeping quiet? You should not be keeping quiet.

Subjunctive 

(Greek   "for arranging underneath", from   "I arrange underneath").

It is often used when the meaning is may, for example in purpose clauses, especially those referring to present or future time:
 
 
 Speak, so that I may hear ( so that I may be hearing).

The above example uses the present subjunctive, but the aorist subjunctive is equally correct, with a slightly different shade of meaning:
 
 
 Speak, so that I may hear ( so that I may hear (straightaway)).

Another very common use of the subjunctive is in indefinite subordinate clauses following a conjunction such as  "if (it may be that)",  "whenever",  "whoever",   "until such time as" etc., referring to present or future time. When used with the subjunctive, such conjunctions are always joined with the particle ἄν (an):
 
 
 Speak, until it is time to go home.

The subjunctive can also be used of something that it is suggested "should" happen, for example in exhortations, deliberative questions, and negative commands such as the following:
 
 
 Come now, let's go.

 
 
 Should we speak (aorist) or should we remain silent (present)?

 .
 .
 Don't be surprised.

The negative of the subjunctive, as in the above example, is μὴ (mē).

Optative 

(Greek:   "for wishing", from   "I wish").

The optative mood can generally be recognised because it has the letters οι (oi), αι (ai) or ει (ei) in the ending.

One use of the optative mood is in conditional sentences referring to a hypothetical situation in the future. The particle ἄν (an) is added in the main clause to give the meaning "would":
 
 
 I would gladly take, if he were to give.

The optative mood is also used in reported speech in past time:
 
 
 He said that he wished to make a sacrifice.

Just as the subjunctive is used after a conjunction meaning "whenever", "until such time as" etc. referring to present or future time, so the optative can be used in similar clauses referring to repeated events in past time. However, in this case the particle ἄν (an) is not added to the conjunction:
 
 
 He used to hunt, whenever he wished to take exercise.

The optative can also be used for wishes:
 
 
 Which may it not happen!

The optative can also be used in purpose clauses in past time, and after verbs of fearing in past time:
 
 
 Someone had summoned him so that he could see the sacrificial entrails.

 
 
 The Greeks were afraid of him in case he might become a tyrant.

However, some authors, such as Herodotus and Thucydides, prefer to use the subjunctive in such clauses.

Imperative 
(Greek:   "for commanding", from   "I command").

The present imperative is used for general commands:
 
 .
 Fear the gods, and honour your parents.

The aorist imperative is used when the speaker wishes something done at once:
 .
 .
 Give me a sword as quickly as possible!

It is also possible in Greek to have a 3rd person imperative, as in the following examples:
 
 
 Someone take her away home (at once).

 .
 .
 The gods be witnesses for us.

The imperative mood can also be used in the perfect tense, as the following example shows:
 .
 
 Let a circle have been drawn with centre A, radius AB.

Non-finite verb forms

Infinitives 

(Greek:  aparémphatos "not indicated").

Forms of the infinitive (active) 
The infinitive is found in all three voices, and in the present, aorist, future, and perfect tenses. The four infinitives of the active voice of the verb λύω (lúō) "I free" are as follows:
 Present :  (lúein) "to free" (in general)
 Future :  (lúsein) "to be going to free"
 Aorist :  (lûsai) "to free" (at once)
 Perfect :  (lelukénai) "to have freed"

This is called the "strong aorist" or "2nd aorist":
 (Strong) aorist :  (labeîn) "to take"

Root aorists take a different infinitive:
 (Root) aorist :  "to go"

 Present :  (horân) "to see"
 Present :  (poieîn) "to do"
 Present :  (dēloûn) "to show"

 Present :  (didónai) "to give" (in general)
 Aorist :  (doûnai) "to give" (now)

 Present :  (eidénai) "to know"

Uses 
The infinitive is often used after verbs with meanings such as "he wanted", "he ordered", "he tried", "it is necessary", "he is able" etc. much as in English:
 
 
 He ordered them to go aside (aorist).

It can also be used for indirect speech after certain verbs such as  "I say" or  "I think". The subject of the infinitive, if it is different from the subject of the main verb, is put in the accusative case.
 
 
 "They say there is no other way" ( "they do not say there to be another way")

In Greek an infinitive is also often used with the neuter definite article in various constructions. In this case it is similar in meaning to the English verbal noun in "-ing":
 
 .
 We refrained from weeping.

Participles 

Participles were given the name  metokhḗ "sharing" by Greek grammarians, because they share the characteristics of both adjectives and verbs. Like adjectives, they have gender, case, and number and agree with the nouns that they modify, and, like verbs, they have tense and voice.

Forms of the participle
Participles exist for all three voices in the present, aorist, future, and perfect tenses.

Active:
 – present
 – future
 – contracting future and contracting present
 – weak aorist
 – strong aorist
 – perfect

Middle and Passive:
 – present and strong aorist middle
 – future middle
 – weak aorist middle
 – weak aorist passive
 – perfect middle or passive

An example of usage 
Participles are very frequently used in Greek. For example, in the following sentence from Plato's Phaedo there are six participles:
 
 
 And the boy, after going out and after spending a long time, came back leading the one intending to give the poison, (who was) carrying it already pounded in a cup.

This example is analysed in the paragraphs below.

Different tenses of the participle 
An aorist participle, such as  "after going out", usually refers to an action which preceded the time of the main verb:
 .
 .
 After going out he came back.

A present participle, such as  "leading", is used to refer to an action which is taking place simultaneously with the main verb:
 .
 .
 He came back leading the man.

A perfect participle, such as  "pounded", generally refers to the state that something is in as a result of an earlier action, e.g. "fallen", "dead", "broken" etc., rather than to the action itself:
 
 
 Carrying the poison already pounded in a cup.

A future participle refers to an action which is to take place after the time of the main verb, and is often used to indicate purpose:
 
 
 He sailed to Athens to report ( going to report) these things.

Agreement 
Because it is an adjective as well as a verb, a participle has to agree in case, gender, and number with the noun it refers to. Thus in the first example above:
  "after going out",  "after spending", and  "leading" are all masculine singular nominative, since they refer to the boy who is the subject of the verb  "came back";
  "intending" and  "carrying" are both masculine singular accusative, since they refer to the man who is the object of the participle  "leading";
  "pounded" is neuter singular accusative, since it describes the poison  which is the object of the participle  "carrying".

Circumstantial participle 
A participle frequently describes the circumstances in which another action took place. Often it is translated with "-ing", e.g.  "leading" in the example above.

In some sentences it can be translated with a clause beginning "when" or "since":
 
 
 When he saw the battle he went to help.

Another frequent use is in a construction known as the "genitive absolute", when the participle and its subject are placed in the genitive case. This construction is used when the participle refers to someone or something who is not the subject, object, or indirect object of the main verb:
 
 
 The Spartans won, with Agesandridas leading them.

But if the verb is an impersonal one, it is put in the accusative, e.g.  "it being possible".

Participle with the article 
Sometimes a participle is used with the article, in which case it can often be translated with "who":
 .
 .
 The (man who was) going to give the poison.

Supplementary participle 
As well as being used in sentences such as the above, the participle can be used following verbs with meanings such as "I know", "I notice", "I happen (to be)", "I hear (that)" and so on. This use is known as the "supplementary" participle.
 
 
 He heard that Cyrus was in Cilicia ( he heard Cyrus being in Cilicia).

 .
 .
 Alcibiades also happened to be present ( chanced being present).

See also 
 Koine Greek grammar
 Modern Greek grammar

References 

 Greek grammar
Ancient Greek
Indo-European verbs